Several countries have a Department of the Treasury. These departments include:
 Department of the Treasury (Australia)
 Department of the Treasury (Isle of Man)
 United States Department of the Treasury
 Department of Treasury (Western Australia)

Many of the States of the United States, the States of Australia, Provinces of Canada, and other political subdivisions also have a Department of the Treasury.
 Department of Treasury and Finance (Victoria), Australia